The Little Rock to Cantonment Gibson Road-Short Mountain Segment is a historic 19th-century road section in Logan County, Arkansas. Built in 1828, it was originally part of the military road connecting Little Rock, Arkansas to what is now Gibson, Oklahoma (then just a military base). The road has been documented to be part of the Trail of Tears migration route.

The road section was listed on the National Register of Historic Places in 2008.

See also
National Register of Historic Places listings in Logan County, Arkansas

References

National Register of Historic Places in Logan County, Arkansas
Buildings and structures completed in 1826
Transportation in Logan County, Arkansas
Roads on the National Register of Historic Places in Arkansas